Walls of Jericho is an American metalcore band from Detroit, formed in 1998.

History 
Candace Kucsulain, Apathemy's singer from 1996 to 1998, joined the band when it was founded.

In April 1999 the band released their first EP, Underestimated, which was followed by a second EP, A Day and a Thousand Years, containing Underestimated and demo tracks, released on Florida-based Eulogy Recordings and later by European imprint Genet. After touring in support of the releases, the band was signed to Trustkill Records and released their debut full-length album The Bound Feed the Gagged in December 1999.

In 2000, it was announced that Walls of Jericho would be taking part of the Metallica tribute series Crush 'Em All for Undecided Records. Walls of Jericho was scheduled to share a split 7-inch vinyl with Indecision and recorded a cover of the song "Disposable Heroes". The split was delayed and eventually shelved, but Undecided Records included Walls of Jericho's recording on the various artists compilation The Old, The New, The Unreleased, released in January 2005.

After unsuccessful auditions to fill the vacant drummer position, the band went into hiatus. Shortly before this, lead vocalist Kucsulain entered a body piercing apprenticeship, which would occupy her free time over the next two years. Also during this time band members Hasty, Ruby and Rawson started a side project band called It's All Gone to Hell.

Alexei Rodriguez joined the band, which began touring again April 2003. The band began writing new material and, in September 2003, completed the recording of their full-length album All Hail the Dead. The band immediately embarked on a European tour with Richard Thurston filling in on guitar from October to December 2003. All Hail the Dead was released in February 2004; the release garnered them support slots for other bands as well as headlining tours of their own. It was not long after the release that Rodriguez left the band. He was replaced by longtime friend Dustin Schoenhofer.

They entered the studio in 2006 with producer Ben Schigel to start recording their third album, With Devils Amongst Us All, which was released in August. "A Trigger Full of Promises" was released as a its first single in April and was included on the MTV2 Headbangers Ball: The Revenge compilation CD.

In October 2007 the band worked with Corey Taylor to produce Redemption, an acoustic-only EP which was released on April 29, 2008, via Trustkill. Taylor providing guest vocals on three of the five tracks. On July 29, 2008, the band released their fourth full-length studio album, The American Dream, that features a return to the band's previous style, and was produced once again by Ben Schigel.
In early 2014, they released "Relentless" as a demo. They released No One Can Save You From Yourself on March 25, 2016, via Napalm Records.

Drummer Dustin Schoenhofer was arrested in 2019 for allegedly transporting 632 pounds of marijuana. Walls of Jericho has played sporadic shows since, including an appearance at FurnaceFest 2021.

Members

Current
Mike Hasty – lead guitar (1998–2001, 2003–present)
Aaron Ruby – bass, backing vocals (1998–2001, 2003–present)
Candace Kucsulain – lead vocals (1998–2001, 2003–present)
Chris Rawson – rhythm guitar (1998–2001, 2003–present)
Dustin Schoenhofer – drums (2004–present)

Former
Wes Keely – drums (1998–2001)
Derek Grant – drums (2001)
Alexei Rodriguez – drums (2003–2004)

Touring musicians
Richard Thurston – rhythm guitar (2003)
Bobby Valeu – guitars (2016–present)
Chris Towning – guitars (2017–2018, 2022)

Timeline

Discography

Studio albums
 The Bound Feed the Gagged (1999)
 All Hail the Dead (2004)
 With Devils Amongst Us All (2006)
 The American Dream (2008)
 No One Can Save You from Yourself (2016)

EPs
 A Day and a Thousand Years (1999)
 From Hell (2006)
 Redemption (2008)

References

External links

 Official Facebook

Hardcore punk groups from Michigan
Metalcore musical groups from Michigan
Musical groups established in 1998
Musical groups disestablished in 2001
Musical groups reestablished in 2003
Musical groups from Detroit
Musical quintets
Trustkill Records artists
Undecided Records artists
Eulogy Recordings artists